is a dormant volcano in Akan Mashu National Park, in eastern Hokkaido. It is located on the north side of Lake Kussharo and straddles the towns of Koshimizu, Teshikaga, Ozora, and Bihoro.

References

Mountains of Hokkaido
Volcanoes of Hokkaido
One-thousanders of Asia
Extinct volcanoes